Kien Pham is a private equity investor and philanthropist living and traveling between the U.S. and Vietnam. As an investor, he collaborates with TPG Capital (www.TPG.com), a leading U.S. firm with nearly US$100 billion under management and also with Red Square Vietnam, a boutique investment and advisory firm based in Ho Chi Minh city.  As a philanthropist, Mr. Pham founded The Vietnam Foundation (www.vnfoundation.org), where he serves as its President, to provide scholarships, healthcare and other social assistance to the poor and handicapped people in Vietnam.  Mr. Pham serves as a board member and strategic advisor to multiple companies and organizations in the U.S. and Vietnam.

Early life
Pham grew up in Saigon, Vietnam. In 1977, at the age of 19, he led his family on a high-seas escape to the United States. They settled in Colorado, where Pham became a factory worker making baby-strollers, learned English and later attended college on a scholarship. He received a B.S. in marketing and international business from the University of Colorado at Boulder, and won a scholarship to study in England. His graduate degrees, earned concurrently at Stanford University, include an M.B.A. in international and organizational management, an M.A. in international economics and a special diploma in public policy management.

Career

VietNamNet Media Group
Pham was CEO and Vice Chairman of VietNamNet Media Group, the number 1 mobile contents company in Vietnam. During 2006 - 2011, he  led the company through a major restructure to realign business units and ready the company for significant domestic and international expansion. VietNamNet is the leading media, entertainment and internet company in Vietnam.  Its main business lines include online news portal, weekly and monthly magazines, mobile value-added services, daily cable TV programs, and brand marketing and media management.

Vietnam Education Foundation
From 2003 to 2006, Pham was the founding Executive Director of the Vietnam Education Foundation (VEF), an independent U.S. federal agency created to bring Vietnam and the United States closer through educational exchanges. Pham started the agency from scratch and within three years built it into an internationally renowned success, with more than 600 top Vietnamese scholars at leading U.S. graduate schools. The U.S. Government has replicated VEF's operating model to globally expand its well-established Fulbright program.

Utility Choice Electric
Prior to VEF, Pham was the senior managing director at Utility Choice Electric, a private retail electric provider in Houston. He was responsible for business strategies, corporate partnerships and alliances, and efforts to secure financial resources to propel the company's strategic growth.

4Real Ventures
Before joining UCE, Pham was the managing principal of 4Real Ventures, a private company involved in hi-tech startups in Silicon Valley and Vietnam. He contributed significantly to the growth of internet deployment and software industry in Vietnam.  Through his ventures, Microsoft was able to gain access to hundreds of Vietnamese software engineers and trained them to use Microsoft development tools and technologies. He pioneered software export initiatives for Vietnamese companies and led them into the U.S. market.  Among his many entrepreneurial ventures, Pham has also founded an advisory practice to help large U.S. companies in Asia/Pacific. He assisted his corporate clients in formulating strategies, assessing markets and pursuing business acquisitions across the region.

Tenneco
From 1992 to 1997, Pham was an international executive at Tenneco. He joined the company as a member of the CEO's executive turnaround team. He led Tenneco into the Asian energy markets and served as its first Vice President and General Manager for Asia/Pacific. Under his leadership,  Tenneco gained a significant presence in the region in both gas pipeline and power generation business.

Pentagon
From 1989 to 1992, Pham served as an appointed Pentagon official for international security affairs under the Office of the Secretary of Defense. He counseled senior defense officials on economic, political and security issues in Asia, Latin America, Africa and the Middle East. Pham also supervised staff groups to carry out highly sensitive missions that cut across organizational lines and required executive direction. During the Persian Gulf War, Pham was a member of the Pentagon crisis management team. He played an early role in formulating the Coalition Burden Sharing Plan that raised $60 billion for the allied forces.

Procter & Gamble International
From 1986 to 1989, Pham was a marketing manager at Procter & Gamble International. He helped construct P&G's strategic Asia entry plan that led to  the company's success in that part of the world. Pham also managed several special marketing programs for the U.S. market, including reversing the decline of a $30 million beauty care business.

White House
From 1985 to 1986, Pham served in the Reagan Administration as a White House Fellow and special assistant to the U.S. Trade Representative. He was among the youngest ever chosen for the program. Pham took part in rigorous bilateral trade negotiations between the U.S. and Asian countries. He has also been a congressional aide to U.S. senator Gary Hart and a project consultant to the U.S. Agency for International Development in Bangkok.

Philanthropy

Vietnam Foundation
In 2008, together with Dr. H. Ray Gamble and Robert Schiffer, Pham founded the Vietnam Foundation (VNF), a non-profit organization, which is dedicated to improving the lives of the Vietnamese people through education. VNF operates as a non-profit, 501(c) (3) organization. VNF headquarters is located in Washington D.C., with a representative office in Hanoi, Vietnam.

One of VNF focuses is Open Educational Resources of which Pham is a strong supporter. VNF is running Vietnam Open Educational Resources (VOER) and is the founding member of the alliance for Vietnam Open Learning Technologies (VOLT).

Philanthropic activities
From 1997 to 1999, Pham took a personal sabbatical to spearhead a quiet and successful  campaign to free political prisoners in Vietnam and to complete a poetry collection. He conducted behind-the-scene negotiations  on the fate of political prisoners and coordinated bargaining positions between U.S. and Vietnamese security officials. Under his initiative,  more than 400 prisoners were released from labor camps and allowed to emigrate to the U.S. He has also founded a non-profit foundation to support orphanages, build schools and fund college scholarships in Vietnam.

Vietnam Forum Foundation
Pham was the founder and chairman of the Vietnam Forum Foundation, and was also a board member of the Vietnam Assistance for the Handicapped.

Awards and recognition
1985: White House Fellow
1986: Young Leader by the American Council on Germany
1988: P&G Chairman's “Turnaround of the Year” Award
1990: Featured among the most outstanding alumni by Stanford University during the school's first 100 years 
1992: Secretary of Defense Achievement Award
1992: U.S.-Japan Leadership Fellow by the Japan Society
1993: Term-member of the Council on Foreign Relations and a participant in the American Assembly
1994: Tenneco Leadership Award for the business achievements
1996: "Never Fear, Never Quit" Award
2000: White House Fellows Legacy of Leadership Award for the philanthropic activities
2004: Honorary doctorate of law degree from Pfeiffer University
2006: Torch of Tomorrow Award for the accomplishments at VEF
2006: Vinh danh nước Việt Award
2007: Pacific Leadership Fellows, School of International Relations and Pacific Studies (IR/PS) at UC San Diego

References

External links
VietNamNet Media Group
The Vietnam Foundation website
Vietnam Open Educational Resources website
Documentary on Mr. Kien Pham - Episode 1 
Documentary on Mr. Kien Pham - Episode 2
VietNamNet article on Mr. Kien Pham
Mr. Kien Pham's speech on Purpose, Passion and Principle

1958 births
Living people
People from Ho Chi Minh City
American people of Vietnamese descent
American financial businesspeople
University of Colorado alumni
Stanford University alumni
United States congressional aides